Adalberto Arturo Madero Quiroga (born 25 September 1969) is a Mexican lawyer and right-wing politician from Nuevo León who has served in the upper house of the Mexican Congress. He was the municipal president of Monterrey from 2006 to 2009.

Personal life and education
Madero is the son of Armando Arturo Madero Almada and Nieves Quiroga de Madero. He studied law at the Universidad Regiomontana. He has speech disfluency problems.

Political career
Madero is a member of the National Action Party (PAN). He has been legal advisor to various PAN public servants in his native Nuevo León and has occupied different positions inside his party including Undersecretary of Finance.

He served as a local deputy in the LXVIII Legislature of the Congress of Nuevo León from 1997 to 2000. In 2000 he became one of the youngest senators to serve in Congress. In 2006 he won the elections for municipal president of Monterrey defeating the Institutional Revolutionary Party (PRI) candidate Abel Guerra.

References

Living people
1969 births
Members of the Congress of Nuevo León
National Action Party (Mexico) politicians
Municipal presidents of Monterrey
Members of the Senate of the Republic (Mexico)
20th-century Mexican politicians
21st-century Mexican politicians
Universidad Regiomontana alumni